Jonathan Silva Vieira (born 3 March 1998), simply known as Jonathan, is a Brazilian footballer who plays as a left back.

Club career
Born in Japeri, Rio de Janeiro, Jonathan joined Botafogo in August 2017, after already making his senior debut at Nova Iguaçu the previous year. Initially on loan, he was bought outright and renewed his contract until 2021 in December 2018.

Promoted to the first team for the 2019 season, Jonathan made his senior debut on 26 January 2019, starting in a 2–1 Campeonato Carioca home loss against Flamengo. He scored his first goal on 3 February, netting the third in a 3–0 away defeat of Boavista.

Jonathan made his Série A debut on 27 April 2019, playing the full 90 minutes in a 2–0 loss at São Paulo. However, he spent the year as a backup to Gilson.

On 20 August 2019, Jonathan signed a five-year contract with Segunda División side UD Almería, for a rumoured fee of €1 million. On 21 September of the following year, he moved to fellow league team UD Las Palmas on loan for one year.

On 31 July 2021, Jonathan returned to his former side Botafogo on loan.

Honours
Botafogo
Campeonato Brasileiro Série B: 2021

References

External links

1998 births
Living people
Sportspeople from Rio de Janeiro (state)
Brazilian footballers
Association football defenders
Campeonato Brasileiro Série A players
Campeonato Brasileiro Série B players
Nova Iguaçu Futebol Clube players
Botafogo de Futebol e Regatas players
Segunda División players
UD Almería players
UD Las Palmas players
Brazilian expatriate footballers
Brazilian expatriate sportspeople in Spain
Expatriate footballers in Spain